1825 Klare is a background asteroid from the central region of the asteroid belt, approximately 15 kilometers in diameter. It was discovered on 31 August 1954, by German astronomer Karl Reinmuth at Heidelberg Observatory in southern Germany. The asteroid was named after Heidelberg astronomer Gerhard Klare.

Orbit and classification 

The presumably stony asteroid orbits the Sun in the central main-belt at a distance of 2.4–3.0 AU once every 4 years and 5 months (1,600 days). Its orbit has an eccentricity of 0.11 and an inclination of 4° with respect to the ecliptic.

Naming 

Klare was named after Gerhard Klare (born 1932), an observing astronomer at Heidelberg Observatory since 1960, whose fields of interest include minor planets. He is also known for his numerous contributions in the yearbook series "Reviews in Modern Astronomy" of the Astronomische Gesellschaft. The official  was published by the Minor Planet Center on 18 April 1977.

Physical characteristics

Rotation period 

Klare has been the subject of multiple photometric lightcurve studies, which gave a well-determined rotation period between 4.741 and 4.744 hours with a brightness variation between 0.70 and 0.90 magnitude. Measurements have also been used as the basis for generating a three-dimensional model of its shape. The Collaborative Asteroid Lightcurve Link (CALL) adopts a period 4.744 hours with an amplitude of 0.70 magnitude.

Diameter and albedo 

According to the survey carried out by the Japanese Akari satellite, Klare measures 14.69 kilometers in diameter, and its surface has an albedo of 0.167, while CALL assumes an albedo of 0.10 – a compromise value for asteroids with a semi-major axis between 2.6 and 2.7 AU, for which neither a S (0.20) nor a C (0.057) type has been determined – and calculates a diameter of 19.21 kilometers with an absolute magnitude of 11.7.

Notes

References

External links 
 PowerPoint presentation – Asteroid 1825 Klare, by Mahfuz Krueng 
 Asteroid Lightcurve Database (LCDB), query form (info )
 Dictionary of Minor Planet Names, Google books
 Asteroids and comets rotation curves, CdR – Observatoire de Genève, Raoul Behrend
 Discovery Circumstances: Numbered Minor Planets (1)-(5000) – Minor Planet Center
 
 

001825
Discoveries by Karl Wilhelm Reinmuth
Named minor planets
19540831